The Texas Legislative Medal of Honor, commonly referred to as the Texas Medal of Honor, is the highest military decoration that can be conferred to a service member of the Texas Military Forces. It can also be conferred to service members of the United States Armed Forces. Subsequent decorations are conferred by a gold twig of four oak leaves with three acorns on the stem device. A lapel button is also conferred with this decoration.

Eligibility 
The Texas Legislative Medal of Honor shall be conferred to a member of the Texas Military Forces or United States Armed Forces (effective June 20, 2003) designated by concurrent resolution of the legislature who voluntarily performs a deed of personal bravery or self-sacrifice involving risk of life that is so conspicuous as to clearly distinguish the person for gallantry and intrepidity above the person's comrades. Decoration shall be considered on the standard of extraordinary merit. Decoration is only conferred on incontestable proof of performance of the deed.

Initially, the law permitted one person to be selected from various nominees for the decoration by a 5-member nominating committee (effective June 20, 2003) every two years since 1997. The nominating committee consists of the Lieutenant Governor, the Speaker of the House, the Adjutant General of the Texas Military Forces and the chairs of the Senate Veteran Affairs Committee and the Defense and Veterans Affairs Committee in the House of Representatives. The law reads in part:

(d) The legislature by concurrent resolution may direct the governor to confer the Texas Legislative Medal of Honor to a person nominated by the nominating committee. The committee chairs serving on the nominating committee shall jointly prepare a concurrent resolution directing the governor to confer the medal to a person nominated. The legislature may direct the medal to be conferred only during a

In 2013, HB 1589 was signed into law by Governor Rick Perry amending the statute for the bestowal of two Texas Legislative Medals of Honor each legislative session, one for service pre-1956 and one for service post-1957.

Authority 
The Texas Legislative Medal of Honor was authorized by the Fifty-eighth Texas Legislature in Senate Bill Number 279 by Senator Babe Schwartz and was approved by the Governor John Connally on May 3, 1963, effective August 23, 1963. The first recipient was not awarded until 1997 when Representative Tommy Merritt discovered that the award existed and had never been awarded. Senator Jerry Patterson, then the chair of the Veteran Affairs and Military Installations Committee, assisted in the process of selecting the first recipient and creating a process for the further awarding of the medal.

Description

Medal 
The medal pendant is gold-finished bronze, 1-1/4 of an inch in diameter. In the center of the pendant is a silver shield with the Alamo in the upper half. The lower half of the shield is divided into two parts, with the cannon of the first battle of the Texas Revolution at Gonzales in the wearer's right portion and the Battle of San Jacinto Vince's Bridge in the wearer's left portion. An enameled wreath of live oak circles the shield on the wearer's right and olive on the wearer's left. Circling the shield, wearer's right to left, are the unfurled flags of Mexico, Spain, France, the Republic of Texas, the Confederate States of America, and the United States, enameled in the respective colors of the flags. Above the shield and between the French and Texas flag is a raised lone star within a circle. Below the shield is a scroll with the inscription "TEXAS MEDAL OF HONOR." The reverse side of the pendant is blank. The pendant is suspended by a metal loop attached to a green moiré silk neckband, 1-3/8 of an inch wide and 24 inches long, behind a hexagonal pad in the center made of matching ribbon. On the hexagonal pad, integral to the ribbon, are six white five-pointed stars in the form of two equilateral triangles, points up, one above the other. The green ribbon color is the same as the green color used in the United States Army's Mexican Border Service Medal.

Device 
A gold twig of four oak leaves with three acorns on the stem is conferred for second and succeeding decorations. Oak leaf clusters will be worn centered on the pad of the neckband and centered on the service ribbon, with the stem of the leaves pointing to the wearer's right. A maximum of three clusters will be worn.

Lapel button 
A lapel button, in the form of an enameled replica of the service ribbon, 1/8 of an inch in height and 21/32 of an inch in width is conferred with this decoration. The Texas Medal of Honor and Texas Medal of Valor are the only decorations with lapel buttons.

Recipients

See also 

Awards and decorations of the Texas Military
Awards and decorations of the Texas government
 Texas Military Forces
 Texas Military Department
 List of conflicts involving the Texas Military

References

External links 

 Texas Legislative Medal of Honor

Texas
Texas Military Department
Texas Military Forces